Tartu Old Town is the oldest part of Tartu, Estonia. 

The centre of the old town is Raekoja plats.

In 1775 the Great Fire of Tartu occurred and almost all infrastructure was destroyed. Today's old town consists of mainly buildings which are built from the late 18th and early 19th centuries.

The old town is protected via Tartu heritage conservation area.

Notable buildings
 Tartu Cathedral
 Main building of Tartu University
 St. John's Church, Tartu

References

Tourist attractions in Tartu
History of Tartu